F-125 or F125 may refer to:
F-125T, a type of film stock
F125-class frigate, a type of German warship
EMD F125, a diesel passenger locomotive
, a Tribal-class frigate launched in 1962 and sold for scrapping in 1980
Mercedes-Benz F125, a concept car model
UIM F-125, a type of International powerboat race